Mon Chéri is an internationally known brand name of the Italian Ferrero company for a chocolate confectionery.

The phrase "mon chéri" is French for "my darling". The Mon Chéri is a single-wrapped combination consisting of a "heart" of cherry (18%) floating in a liqueur (13%) and contained in a bittersweet chocolate housing (69%). Each praline contains 46 kilocalories and is packaged in a red/pink wrapper.

Mon Chéri appeared for the first time in Italy in 1956. From 1960 it was produced and marketed on the French and UK markets, and from 1961 on the German market. The name was chosen as a reference to the French way of life and was quickly adopted as brand name for the international market.

For the American market Mon Chéri was actually filled with hazelnuts and did not contain liqueur, similar to the Ferrero Küsschen that are sold in Germany and Denmark. After more than 20 years this variety was discontinued, except in Puerto Rico where it is imported from Germany as "Mon Cheri." Most other markets still sell the cherry-filled Mon Chéri.

See also
 List of confectionery brands

References

External links

 

Ferrero SpA brands
Chocolate